Uniklubi is a Finnish alternative rock band. It was founded in 1999. The band became well known for its hit "Rakkautta ja piikkilankaa" in 2004. The band's lyrics are in the Finnish language. All members are from the town of Hämeenkyrö, except the bassist Teemu Rajamäki, who is from Ikaalinen. Originally they called themselves 'Pincenez' but they did not get much positive feedback about it, so they renamed their band 'Uniklubi', a Finnish word that means 'Dream Club'.

History 
The band was founded in 1999 by Jussi and Pasi. The name "Uniklubi" did not exist at the time; they went by the name Pincenez (a French term for a type of glasses without earpieces). The first songs they played were covers of their favorite bands, in English. However, as they began writing their own songs, Jussi felt more confident with his mother tongue, Finnish. They eventually changed the name to Uniklubi ("dream club"), which had no real significance for them.

By playing their first gigs, they earned some money they used to go into studio and record their first demo-tapes.

While recording the first album "Rakkautta Ja Piikkilankaa" (Love and Barbed-Wire) the drummer left the band. Antti Matikainen replaced him and has been part of Uniklubi ever since.

The first single was "Rakkautta Ja Piikkilankaa". It was voted by YleX as the most popular song of the year. The album got into the charts (Top 4) and Uniklubi got their first important award: They won an Emma Award (Newcomer of the year).
"Rakkautta Ja Piikkilankaa" reached platinum in Finland (They sold more than 30,000 copies of the album).
Other releases of "Rakkautta Ja Piikkilankaa": Kylmää, Näiden Tähtien Alla and Totuus.

The second album, "Kehä" (Circle) was released on November 2 and the album entered the charts at number one. It stayed in the charts for more than 20 weeks in the Top20 and even the first release of the album "Kaikki Mitä Mä Annoin" (All that I gave) entered the charts at number one.
The second release was "Kiertää Kehää" and entered the charts at number ten.

During summer 2006, the singer was diagnosed with a bump on his vocal cords, after losing his voice repeatedly during concerts. The band had to cancel a tour in Germany, which would have been their first outside Scandinavia, for Jussi to undergo throat surgery. Everything went fine, and the few gigs performed during the Christmas holidays were marked by a beautiful, new clear voice.

The band entered studios again at the beginning of 2007, and have already released their first single, "Vnus", in May, along with the track "Aurinkoni" (My Sun) as a b-side. The new album, titled "Luotisade" (Bullet Rain) was released in August 2007.

On March 4, 2009, the band released a new album titled "Syvään valoon." The first single from the album was "Polje". They later released "Kukka" as the new single.

During the summer 2010 Uniklubi had several gigs added with the unique group of musicians. They had one pianist, two violinists, altoviolinist and cellist.

On September 22, Uniklubi released their fifth studio album titled "Kultakalat" (Goldfishes). On 31 September the band started their album release tour which will lasted until the late summer of 2011.

Related bands 
Like many other Finnish bands, Uniklubi can easily be linked to other groups, whether by friendships or collaborations. 
Jussi Selo, singer for Uniklubi, has previously sung for Lovex, as well as guest backing vocals on some of Negative's tracks. More recently, he participated with backing vocals to the cover of Queen's "Too Much Love Will Kill You", interpreted by Negative's Jonne Aaron, Sir Christus and Larry Love, Jann Wilde and Rose Avenue's Jann Wilde and Dead By Gun's Christian. Ville Liimatainen, younger brother of Jonne, also contributed to the backing vocals. In Bloodpit's 2007 video "Wise Men Don't Cry", Jussi played a vengeful brother, alongside Antti Anatomy of Negative. He has also sung backing vocals on several songs for Finnish rock band, Sisu.
Janne Selo previously sang for the band Bitch So Sweet, a quartet he left as Uniklubi took more of his time. He also replaced Entwine's guitarist for 5 concerts in their spring tour in Germany.

Band members 
 Jussi Selo (born January 21, 1985 in Tampere, Finland) – vocals
 Janne Samuli Selo (born April 16, 1980) – guitars
 Pasi Viitala (born March 6, 1983) – electronic guitar
 Teemu Rajamäki – bass guitar
 Antti Matikainen – drums

Teemu Rajamäki left the band on March 19, 2012. This was announced on the band's homepage.

Discography

Albums 
Rakkautta ja piikkilankaa (2004)
Kehä (2005)
Luotisade (2007)
Syvään Valoon (2009)
Kultakalat (2010)
Tulennielijä (2018)
Ajan piirtämät kasvot (2020)

Singles 
Rakkautta ja piikkilankaa (2004) (Love and Barbed Wire)
Kylmää (2004) (Cold)
Olemme Yhtä (2004) (We Are One)
Totuus (2004) (The Truth)
Näiden tähtien alla (2004) (Underneath These Stars)
Kaikki mitä mä annoin (2005) (All That I Gave)
Huomenna (Promotional Single) (2005) (Tomorrow)
Kiertää Kehää (2006) (Rounding Circle)
Tuhka (Promotional Single) (2006) (Ash)
Vnus (2007) (Venus)
Luotisade (Promotional Single) (2007) (Bulletrain)
Polje (2009) (Box)
Kukka (2009) (Flower)
Aikasi On Nyt (2010) (Your Time Is Now)

Music videos 
 Rakkautta ja piikkilankaa
 Kaikki mitä mä annoin
 Huomenna
 Vnus
 Luotisade
 Rakkaudesta hulluuteen
 Polje
 Kukka
 Mitä vittua?
 Aikasi on nyt
 Maailma Puhaltaa
 Pakkopaita

References

External links

 Uniklubi.net  (Finnish)
 Uniklubi.co.uk  (English website)
 Uniklubi.de (German and English)
 Uniklubi-band.de.vu (German)
 Uniklubi Myspace

Finnish musical groups